Seth Doane (born June 26, 1978) is an American television journalist, working for CBS News.

Career
Doane is a Peabody Award winning CBS News reporter who was named correspondent for "60 in 6", the new 60 Minutes streaming program. "Seth has covered some of the most important stories of the last decade, and I can't wait for him to start reporting for '60 in 6'", 60 Minutes Executive Producer Bill Owens said in March 2020 when CBS made the announcement.

Doane had been a regular contributor to CBS Sunday Morning, and his role as a correspondent was formalized in early 2020 as announced by CBS News. CBS Sunday Morning executive producer, Rand Morrison, said "Seth is a superb fit for "Sunday Morning". His reporting is smart and sensitive - and he brings a signature style to every story he does."

He was part of the team at CBS News Sunday Morning to be awarded the 2020 News Emmy Award for "Outstanding News Special" for a special broadcast from Florence, Italy, "A Sunday Morning In Florence". The Rome, Italy based Doane contributed three separate pieces to the Emmy award-winning broadcast.

Doane began his career at WNYW, New York City's Fox affiliate, as a field producer. Channel One News, the high-school TV network, then made him a news anchor, sending him abroad to cover stories in San Salvador, Indonesia, Iran, Afghanistan, and the Sudan.

In April 2006 CNN hired Doane as a special video news correspondent for South Asia, including India.  He remained with CNN, based in New Delhi, until June 2007.

In August 2007, Doane became a national correspondent for CBS News, covering domestic issues. In 2008 he began reporting a segment titled "The Other America" on the effects of the economic recession on individual people and families. Doane is also a frequent correspondent for CBS News Sunday Morning.

From April 2013 until March 2016, Doane was based in Beijing, China, covering events in Asia for CBS News. Since April 2016, he has been based in Rome and covering Europe, Africa, and the Middle East for CBS News.  On September 6, 2014, Doane married Andrea Pastorelli in a same-sex civil ceremony in Arezzo, Italy at the Villa Rosa Badia Di Campoleone.

In March 2020, Doane tested positive for COVID-19. He was one of the first news correspondents to go public and told Gayle King on CBS This Morning that he did so to raise awareness, combat stigma and help people recognize symptoms.

Childhood
Seth Doane is a 12th generational Cape Codder. The detail was revealed in a story for CBS which profiled his father, Paul Doane a former Republican State Senator who represented "Cape Cod and the Islands" in Massachusetts. The story was about his father's hobby, oyster fishing in Wellfleet.

References

External links

American television reporters and correspondents

Living people
CNN people
CBS News people
Year of birth missing (living people)
American LGBT journalists